Lieutenant-General Sir Edmond Charles Acton Schreiber,  (30 April 1890 – 8 October 1972) was a senior British Army officer who served in both the First World War and the Second World War. In the latter he commanded the 45th Infantry Division, V Corps and the British First Army.

Military career
Born in London, England, on 30 April 1890, the son of Brigadier-General Acton Lemuel Schreiber, Edmond Charles Acton Schreiber was educated at Wellington College, Berkshire and the Royal Military Academy, Woolwich, from where he was commissioned as a second lieutenant into the British Army's Royal Field Artillery on 23 December 1909. He was promoted to lieutenant on 23 December 1912. He served in the First World War with the British Expeditionary Force (BEF) on the Western Front, earning the Distinguished Service Order (DSO) in December 1914, the citation for which reads:

He was also four times mentioned in dispatches and ended the war as a brevet major, having been promoted to that rank on 1 January 1918.

In the 1930s, during the interwar period, he attended the Staff College, Camberley, from 1923−1924, before returning there as an instructor from 1930−1933, later becoming a staff officer at the War Office from 1934−1937, Chief Staff Officer at the Senior Officers' School, Sheerness, in 1938, and was Brigadier Royal Artillery in Southern Command, from 1938−1939, the same year the Second World War began.

During the Second World War Schreiber served with the British Expeditionary Force (BEF) in France between 1939 and 1940. Promoted to acting Major-General on 26 April 1940, he became General Officer Commanding (GOC) 61st Infantry Division on the same date, before being made GOC 45th Infantry Division later in 1940. In May 1941 he was promoted to acting Lieutenant-General to take command of V Corps later that year. In May 1942 he received the rank of temporary lieutenant-general, and in July that year he was appointed to command the British First Army (in reality an Anglo-American formation) which was later to be the parent organisation for Allied forces in French North Africa after Operation Torch in November. Schreiber had to resign after only two months, however, as he developed a kidney problem and became unfit for active service.

Restricted to non-field roles, he became General Officer Commanding-in-Chief (GOC-in-C) Western Command in 1942 and of South Eastern Command in 1944. Between 1944 and 1946, Schreiber was Governor and Commander-in-Chief of Malta. He retired from the British Army after the war in 1947.

Retirement
He was appointed Deputy Lieutenant of Devon in 1948 and National President of the Old Contemptibles Association in 1960.

Family
Edmond Schreiber married Phyllis Barchard in 1916; there were two daughters.

References

Bibliography

External links
Biography of Lieutenant General Sir Edmond SCHREIBER
British Army Officers 1939–1945
Generals of World War II

|-

|-

|-

|-

|-

|-

1890 births
1972 deaths
British Army generals of World War II
British Army personnel of World War I
Companions of the Distinguished Service Order
Deputy Lieutenants of Devon
Governors and Governors-General of Malta
Graduates of the Royal Military Academy, Woolwich
Graduates of the Staff College, Camberley
Knights Commander of the Order of the Bath
Knights of the Order of St John
People educated at Wellington College, Berkshire
Royal Artillery officers
British Army lieutenant generals
Academics of the Staff College, Camberley
Military personnel from London